Bailya is a genus of sea snails, marine gastropod mollusks in the family Pisaniidae.

Species
Species within the genus Bailya include:
 Bailya anomala (Hinds, 1844)
 Bailya cidaris Watters, 2013
 Bailya intricata (Dall, 1884)
 Bailya morgani Watters, 2009
 Bailya negrilana Bozzetti, 2018
 Bailya parva (C. B. Adams, 1850)
 Bailya sanctorum Watters, 2009
 Bailya weberi (Watters, 1983):
 Species brought into synonymy
 Bailya marijkae De Jong & Coomans, 1988 : synonym of Ameranna milleri (Nowell-Usticke, 1959)
 Bailya milleri Nowell-Usticke, 1959: synonym of Ameranna milleri (Nowell-Usticke, 1959)

References

External links
 Watters, G. T. (2009). A revision of the western Atlantic Ocean genera Anna, Antillophos, Bailya, Caducifer, Monostiolum, and Parviphos, with description of a new genus, Dianthiphos, and notes on Engina and Hesperisternia Gastropoda: Buccinidae: Pisaniinae) and Cumia (Colubrariidae). The Nautilus. 123(4): 225-275

Pisaniidae
Gastropod genera